XCT-790 is a potent and selective inverse agonist ligand of the estrogen-related receptor alpha (ERRα). Independent of its inhibition of ERRα, XCT-790 is a potent mitochondrial electron transport chain uncoupler.

Mitochondrial electron transport chain uncoupling effect
XCT-790 has been shown to uncouple oxygen consumption from ATP production in mitochondria at very low, nanomolar-range doses independently of ERRα expression. Its effects are similar to proton ionophores such as FCCP, which disrupt mitochondrial transmembrane electrochemical gradients. This uncoupling leads to a fast drop in ATP production and, consequently, a prompt activation of AMPK.

References

External links
 

Nitriles
Trifluoromethyl compounds
Thiadiazoles
Uncoupling agents